Flagler Bay is an Arctic waterway in Qikiqtaaluk Region, Nunavut, Canada. It is located in Nares Strait by eastern Ellesmere Island between Bache Peninsula and Knud Peninsula.

Geography

References

Bays of Qikiqtaaluk Region
Ellesmere Island